Changing Faces may refer to:

Changing Faces (charity), a British charity which works in the area of disfigurement
Changing Faces (group), a United States R&B duo
Changing Faces (Changing Faces album)
Changing Faces (Bros album)
Changing Faces – The Very Best of 10cc and Godley & Creme, compilation album
"Changing Faces", television episode of All That (season one)